Mare matto, also known as Mad Sea and Crazy Sea, is a 1963 French-Italian comedy-drama film directed by Renato Castellani. The film entered the competition at the 24th Venice International Film Festival.

Plot

Cast 
Jean-Paul Belmondo as il Livornese
Gina Lollobrigida as  Margherita, 
Tomas Milian as  Efisio Trombetta
Odoardo Spadaro as   Drudo Parenti
Michele Abruzzo as  Oreste 
Piero Morgia as  Benedetto Lo Russo
Pietro Tordi as  Il Poeta
Tano Cimarosa as  Castelluzzo 
Anita Durante as  Rosaria Lo Russo 
Lamberto Maggiorani as  Marinaio
 Rossana Di Rocco as 	Nedda
 Noël Roquevert as 	L'avvocato

References

External links

1963 films
Italian comedy-drama films
1963 comedy-drama films
Films directed by Renato Castellani
Films scored by Carlo Rustichelli
French black-and-white films
Italian black-and-white films
Films set in the Mediterranean Sea
Lux Film films
1960s French films
1960s Italian films